Victor Derély (1840–1904) was a French man of letters and translator.

Born in Paris and a former student of the École normale supérieure, Derély was an important translator of Russian literature of the last quarter of the nineteenth. Translating relatively little, he is best known for his translations of Dostoyevsky: Crime and Punishment, The Idiot, Demons, Poor Folk. He also translated Aleksey Pisemsky, Elias von Cyon, Nadezhda Khvoshchinskaya, Ivan Sechenov and Nikolai Leskov.

Works 
 1876: Nouveaux morceaux choisis de poètes et de prosateurs latins, recueillis et annotés 
 1884: Le Crime et le Châtiment, 1884, was the first French translation of Fyodor Dostoyevsky's novel.

See also

Sources 
 Victor Derély
 Jean-Claude Polet, Patrimoine littéraire européen: anthologie en langue française. Index général, Brussels: De Boeck université, 2000, p. 358 Read online

References

External links 
 Note sur les traductions on La Bibliothèque Russe et Slave

Russian–French translators
19th-century translators
École Normale Supérieure alumni
1840 births
Writers from Paris
1904 deaths